Fernando Fernandes de Pádua is a Brazilian paracanoeist and fashion model who has competed since the late 2000s. He won a gold medal in the K-1 200 m A event at the 2010 ICF Canoe Sprint World Championships in Poznań and one year later at the 2011 ICF Canoe Sprint World Championships in Szeged.

Filmography

References

Brazilian male canoeists
Living people
Year of birth missing (living people)
ICF Canoe Sprint World Championships medalists in paracanoe
Paracanoeists of Brazil
A classification paracanoeists
Big Brother (franchise) contestants
Big Brother Brasil